Pi Kappa Phi, commonly known as Pi Kapp(s), is an American Greek Letter secret and social fraternity. It was founded by Andrew Alexander Kroeg Jr., Lawrence Harry Mixson, and Simon Fogarty Jr. on December 10, 1904 at the College of Charleston in Charleston, South Carolina. The fraternity has 187 active chapters (168 chartered chapters and 19 associate chapters), and more than 113,000 initiated members.

Pi Kappa Phi's mission statement is "To create an uncommon and lifelong brotherhood that develops leaders and encourages service to others for the betterment of our communities." The fraternity's vision statement is "A future where every Pi Kappa Phi embraces his role as a leader, puts service before self and improves the world around him."

Pi Kappa Phi operates in four entities: Pi Kappa Phi Fraternity, Pi Kappa Phi Foundation, The Ability Experience, and Pi Kappa Phi Properties. Pi Kappa Phi operates its own philanthropy, The Ability Experience (formerly known as Push America), which works with individual chapters to serve people with disabilities. Among the most notable members are Senator Lindsey Graham, former Wisconsin Governor and founder of Earth Day Gaylord Nelson, baseball hall of famer Joe Sewell, social media entrepreneur and actor Jimmy Tatro, politician George Wallace Jr., and several former governors of the states of Mississippi, South Carolina, North Carolina, and Pennsylvania.

History

Nu Phi

Pi Kappa Phi was founded in 1904 by Andrew Alexander Kroeg Jr., a 19-year-old senior at the college; Simon Fogarty Jr., a 17-year-old junior; and Lawrence Harry Mixson, a 16-year-old sophomore. All three of the men were from Charleston.

In 1904, the College of Charleston was a small, municipal college. The all-male college was the first municipal college in the country, and the thirteenth oldest educational institution in the United States.  The school had a campus literary society called the Chrestomathics, which held activities such as debates. The college's monthly magazine was staffed by the officers of the Chrestomathics, forming the equivalent of a modern-day student government.

The three men set a goal to obtain officer positions within the Chrestomathic Literary Society. At that time, the organization was dominated by the three chapters of national fraternities on campus. All fraternity men were sworn to vote for their candidates, making it virtually impossible for any non-fraternity men to win election.

Kroeg, Mixson, Fogarty, and a group of their friends, all non-fraternity men, began forming an opposition party. Several meetings were held at Mixson's home on Wentworth Street leading to the formation of Nu Phi, which stood for "non-fraternity." The group of 15 men developed an opposing slate and began campaigning. Nu Phi adopted the outline of a hand as its secret symbol. A sketched hand on a classroom chalkboard signified an upcoming meeting. Inside the hand was written the meeting time and the host's last name.

The Nu Phi group assigned a member to kidnap those who might vote for the fraternity ticket on election day. However, the Nu Phi ticket lost the elections. Later, it was revealed that several disloyal members cast their votes for the opposing fraternity slate. Kroeg, determined to see his friends have a chance at winning elections, decided that the only way to gain the influence of the fraternity men on campus was to begin his own fraternity.

Founding

On December 10, 1904, a meeting of the loyal Nu Phis was held at Fogarty's home at 90 Broad Street to establish a new fraternity. There were seven men in attendance at the meeting: Kroeg, Fogarty, Mixson, Anthony Pelzer Wagener, Thomas F. Mosimann, Theodore ("Teddy") Barnwell Kelley, and James Fogarty (Simon's younger brother). All of the original members were students at the college and had grown up together in Charleston.

Wagener, who was a student of Greek and Latin, recommended the letters Pi Kappa Phi and their secret meaning as the official new name of the group. Simon proposed the design of the fraternity's pin, a black enamel diamond with the Greek letters  engraved in gold with a star and lamp as additional elements. Kroeg was selected as the new chapter's first president, which was termed "Archon", from the Greek term. He then began work on a constitution for chapter. The group quickly set out to recruit new members to its ranks.

On December 10, 1905, the first anniversary of the fraternity's founding, Mixson's mother cooked the men a special dinner in her home to celebrate a successful first year as a fraternity. The fraternity celebrate that date as "Founders Day" with a dinner or a similar ceremony. In 1906 Mixson and Wagener wrote the fraternity's initiation ritual as the "highest ideals of Christian manhood".

Expansion
That same year, the group was offered a charter from another U.S. fraternity. Instead, they chose to expand and create more Pi Kappa Phi chapters. A second chapter Beta chapter, was formed at Presbyterian College on March 9, 1907. Due to a state law banning fraternities at state supported schools, Presbyterian College and the College of Charleston were the only two South Carolina schools where fraternities were allowed. A third chapter was formed at the University of California, Berkeley, Gamma chapter, which was the first chapter of the Fraternity to obtain a house.

Kroeg developed "Articles of Incorporation" and the name Pi Kappa Phi became legally registered in the state of South Carolina on December 23, 1907.

The interest in Pi Kappa Phi within South Carolina was growing despite laws and policies banning fraternities. In 1909, Delta chapter at Furman University formed and operated in secret until state laws changed, allowing fraternal organizations. In 1910, a charter was granted to Sigma chapter at the University of South Carolina and the chapter was operated as the Sigma Club due to the laws banning fraternities.

In modern times, the fraternity is largely considered to be a "southern fraternity," as many of its more notable alumni and chapters are located in the southern states, however the fraternity is expanding and has a growing presence in the northeast, at schools such as Sacred Heart University, the University of Connecticut, and the University of Maine.

The Star and Lamp
The Pi Kappa Phi Fraternity Journal was begun in 1909, with Henry Wagener as editor. In 1911, the name was changed to The Star and Lamp.

Local chapter misconduct 
In 2022, the chapter at Clemson University was suspended for four years mainly due to hazing. It was reported that new pledges acted as servants to members of the fraternity and were often berated and humiliated for various reasons.

On February 11, 2022, members of the Beta Chapter of the fraternity at Presbyterian College were involved in what the school's president called "racist, misogynistic, and hateful behaviors" before a women's lacrosse game vs. Howard University, a HBCU, at the college. After a three month independent investigation, several students were expelled and the fraternity was permanently removed from campus.

In 2021, the chapter at Virginia Tech was removed from campus and lost its national charter after it was determined they were guilty of hazing and causing upwards of $18,000 worth of damage to their on-campus fraternity house.

In 2020, the fraternity at the University of Illinois at Urbana-Champaign was put on interim suspension after holding large parties linked to outbreaks of COVID-19 cases. The fraternity at the University of Pittsburgh was also suspended, along with several others, for violating the university’s health and safety guidelines related to COVID-19. Nine students from the fraternity at SUNY Plattsburgh were suspended for violating campus rules and local laws related to alcohol, nuisance, hazing, and endangerment, and the fraternity was issued a cease and desist order that ended its status as an officially recognized student organization.

In 2020, the University of Kansas chapter was shut down after university officials investigated repeated incidents of hazing and illicit drug use.  The chapter was expelled from the university for 5 years, ending in the spring of 2026. Similarly, the Iota Psi chapter at Boise State University was suspended for five (5) years following "repeated violations," according to the school.

In 2019, the University of Texas at Austin chapter was shut down after university officials investigated submitted complaints of hazing. This was the second chapter to be shut down at UT, the fraternity having only been re-colonized there about 12 years prior; the first chapter was shut down in 2000 for similar reasons.

In 2019, several members of the fraternity at Texas State University brutally attacked a fellow student they mistakenly assumed was a member of their rival fraternity on campus Phi Kappa Psi, leaving him with a fractured skull and a traumatic brain injury.  As a result, the fraternity was placed on suspension, some members faced criminal charges, and the attacked student filed a lawsuit against the fraternity.

In 2017, the chapter at Central Michigan University was suspended indefinitely by the university for failure to adhere to previous sanctions.

In July 2017, the Alpha chapter at the College of Charleston was suspended by the college following a probe investigating allegations of drug and alcohol use, hazing, and the alleged beating of a student. The fraternity is forbidden from recolonizing the campus until Fall 2019.

In November 2017, a Florida State University (FSU) student named Andrew Coffey was found unresponsive the morning after an unaffiliated off campus house party. Coffey, a Pi Kappa Phi fraternity pledge, was given medical treatment in an attempt to resuscitate, but died soon thereafter. After his death, FSU suspended all 58 fraternities and sororities on campus, and banned alcohol from student events.

In 2016, the fraternity at the University of South Florida (USF) was suspended after a 16 year old girl was raped while she was unconscious in the fraternity's house.  The girl was visiting the campus and decided to attend the fraternity's house party. A fraternity member confessed to the rape and was arrested. A few months prior to the rape incident at USF, another rape allegation involving the fraternity at Purdue University was reported to the campus police department

In 2016, the fraternity at the Miami University was suspended for multiple hazing and alcohol violations.

In 2016, four fraternity members at Radford University were arrested for hazing.

In 2015, the chapter at Pennsylvania State University was shut down for hazing pledges, alcohol abuse, and disorderly conduct. It was re-colonized in the spring of 2018.

In Spring 2015, the fraternity at the Elon University was kicked off the campus until 2017 for hazing and hosting an unapproved event.

An alleged pledge notebook of Pi Kappa Phi's North Carolina State University chapter was found in Raleigh. It contained numerous racist statements and comments about raping women and girls.  The national organization placed the chapter on an interim suspension. NCSU suspended all social events at the chapter that involved alcohol.

A student pledging the California State University, Northridge chapter of Pi Kappa Phi died in the summer of 2014 during a mandatory 18-mile hike in what his family alleges was a hazing ritual. Nineteen-year-old Armando Villa died during the trip to the Angeles National Forest. Villa's family reported that other boys on the hike said they were "left barefoot with very little water to share between the boys, and no cellphones, and to find their way out of the forest." In September 2014, the University announced that the national and local chapters of the Pi Kappa Phi fraternity voted to withdraw permanently from the university. The fraternity is being sued by Villa's family.

In December 2013, two Pi Kappa Phi members were arrested and charged with harassment at the University of Tennessee at Knoxville.  The fraternity members were retaliating against a former pledge who reported to school officials physical and verbal abuse he experienced while he was seeking to join the fraternity.

In 2012, the fraternity at the University of North Florida was suspended after asking a pledge to vandalize the campus and offering him marijuana.

In 2010, the fraternity at the University of Georgia (UGA) was suspended after a father of a pledge wrote an anonymous letter to UGA's Greek Life Office detailing the abusive hazing rituals his son endured in order to be fully welcomed into the fraternity.

In 2000, the California State University, Chico chapter was dissolved and later permanently banned after the alcohol-related hazing death of freshman student Adrian Heideman. In response to Heideman's death the national chapter created an alcohol-awareness video for distribution to all members, "The Choice Is Yours."

Alumni

Chapters

As of 2013 Pi Kappa Phi reports having over 113,000 members. Pi Kappa Phi has granted 231 charters, with an average chapter size of 55. There are 168 active chartered chapters plus 19 associate chapters (colonies).

See also
List of social fraternities and sororities

References

External links

 
Student organizations established in 1904
North American Interfraternity Conference
1904 establishments in South Carolina